Tryavna Ultra is one of the biggest ultramarathon races in Bulgaria. It is held every year in July in the region around Tryavna. The longest course is 141 km long with 5840 m of elevation gain. Two additional courses are available - 76 km with 2820 m of elevation gain and 23 km with 706 m. The route of the long distance runs through the heart of the Balkan cultural heritage – architectural park Bozhentsi, an attractive place for tourists from around the world, through beautiful woodlands in eco-park Bulgarian woman, through three municipalities and dozens of picturesque villages.

Tryavna Ultra is a qualifying race for Ultra-Trail du Mont-Blanc, 141 km course ensures 6 points, while the 76 km course - 4 points.

Race winners 

141 km

76 km

23 km

References

External links 
 Official site

Ultramarathons